Southampton is a Canadian rural community in York County, New Brunswick.

The community is located on the east side of the Saint John River, 3.71 km south of Nackawic and south of Southampton Junction, a station located within the village of Millville, created when the New Brunswick Railway was constructed in the 1870s.

History

The community was founded in 1787, when land was granted to the Loyalist members of the Pennsylvania Loyalists Regiment.

A post office branch was established in 1853 and removed in 1914.
In 1866, Southampton was a farming community with approximately 68 resident families. In 1871 Southampton and surrounding district had a population of 300. In 1898 Southampton had 1 post office, 3 stores, 2 churches and a population of 100.

Notable people

See also
List of communities in New Brunswick

References

Populated places established in 1787
Communities in York County, New Brunswick